is a Japanese TV drama series which was aired in Japan on TBS from July through September 1995. It was the number one Japanese drama that year, and led to a brief fad of interest in Japanese Sign Language. the Korean remake will star Jung Woo-sung and Shin Hyun-bin in leading roles

Synopsis 
Hiroko, a young actress living in Tokyo, meets Koji one day when attempting to grab an apple from a tree in the neighborhood and he plucks it out for her. The two meet again and again in the park until one time, when she is practicing a role in the park, she learns from a child that Koji can neither speak nor hear. From this point on, the two begin to grow closer together and Hiroko even learns Japanese Sign Language to understand Koji better.

Cast 
 Toyokawa Etsushi as Koji Sakaki
 Takako Tokiwa as Hiroko Mizuno
  as Kenichi Yabe 
 Ranran Suzuki as Maki Yoshida 
 Kimiko Yo as Kaoru Kanzaki 
 Akiko Yada as Shiori Sakaki 
 Yumi Asō as Hikaru Shimada

Production 
 Screenwriter: Eriko Kitagawa
 Producer: Seiichiro Kijima
 Directors: Jiro Shono (1,2,5,7,8,12), Hiroyasu Doi (3,4,6,10,11), Katsuo Fukuwa (9)
 Music: Masato Nakamura

References

External links 
 Aishiteiru to Itte Kure at jdorama.com

Kin'yō Dorama
Japanese romance television series
1995 Japanese television series debuts
1995 Japanese television series endings